Lethapora, also known as Lethpora and Lalitpur, is a village in the Pulwama district of Jammu and Kashmir, India. It is located in the Pampore tehsil of district Pulwama in Kashmir valley. It has a long history as it was named after a king Lalitaditya Muktapida, who was a powerful ruler of the Karkota dynasty of Kashmir. It was first named as Lalitpur and later changed to Lethapora. It is one of the main market for tourists and locals for Kashmiri dry fruits like walnuts, almonds etc. You can get world's finest saffron from here, which is available easily in the market. It mainly has three main markets that is Upper Market (Her Bazar), Main Market and Down Market (Bon Bazar). Upper market is like the corporate area of the village which mainly has mixture of shops like saffron and other dry fruit shops, restaurants, hotels, tea stalls, banks, school, gym, showrooms etc. In Main Market, you will find basic shops selling fruits, vegetables, kirana and other basics and in the Down Market it mostly has saffron shops along with other shops, and restaurants

Location
Lethapora is located on the banks of Jhelum River. It lies at the foothills of south-western corner of Zabarwan mountain range locally known as Vastoorwun. The Srinagar Jammu National Highway passes through the village.

Demographics 

According to the 2011 census of India, Lethapora has 828 households, with over population of more than 6100 which is second highest in district Pulwama. It is the second largest village in Pulwama in terms of population. The average literacy rate (i.e. the literacy rate of population excluding children aged 6 and below) is 70.53%. Most people of the village are associated with agriculture. Saffron is the main crop and the main source of income for the village.

Education

Lethapora has the average literacy rate of 70.53% according to 2011 census. 3,470 males and 2,661 females. It is hub of education for nearby villages like Hajibal, Banderpora, Goripora, Barsu, Oudipora, Jawbehara, Chandhara etc. as this village has the largest network of schools.

Lethapora is a school cluster in Pampora block of Pulwama district in Jammu And Kashmir Which is having about 22 Schools in it. In which 9 are present in Lethapora. This cluster include all private and government schools of this area. Here is List all the government and private schools of this cluster is listed below. 

Apart from this it has Green Valley College of Education.

References

Villages in Pulwama district